The 1988 CART PPG Indy Car World Series season was the 10th national championship season of American open wheel racing sanctioned by CART. The season consisted of 15 races, and one non-points exhibition event. Danny Sullivan was the national champion, winning for Team Penske. The rookie of the year was John Jones. The 1988 Indianapolis 500 was sanctioned by USAC, but counted towards the CART points championship. Rick Mears won the Indy 500, his third victory at Indy.

The 1988 season was the breakout year for the Ilmor Chevrolet Indy V-8 engine. After being introduced in 1986, and earning its first victory in 1987, the Ilmor Chevy dominated the series in 1988, and established itself as the best powerplant on the circuit. Chevy won 14 of the 15 races, and all 15 pole positions. Along the way, the Ilmor Chevy earned its first victory at Indianapolis in 1988, with Rick Mears winning from the pole.

Season recap
Danny Sullivan won four races, nine pole positions, and had 11 top five finishes en route to the championship title. Sullivan got off to a slow start, but at Indy, he and his Penske teammates (Rick Mears and Al Unser) dominated the month of May. The Penske team swept all three spots on the front row, and led 192 of the 200 laps. Sullivan himself qualified second and dominated the first half of the race. He dropped out just beyond the halfway point when a wing adjuster failed and sent his car into the wall. He rebounded over the next six races, posting two wins and no finish worse than 4th.

Sullivan's nearest competitors during the season were Al Unser Jr. and Bobby Rahal. Unser Jr. left Doug Shierson Racing after a winless 1987 campaign and returned to Galles Racing for 1988, and also got use of the coveted Chevrolet engine. Unser won at Long Beach and Toronto, then won a controversial race at the Meadowlands. Battling for the lead in the late stages of the race, he tangled with Emerson Fittipaldi, sending Fittipaldi into the tire barrier.

Back-to-back defending CART champion, and 1986 Indy winner Bobby Rahal returned for his last season at Truesports. The team dropped the Cosworth DFX and the took up development of the Judd AV engine. The engine was known to be down on horsepower, but excelled in fuel mileage and reliability, particularly in the 500-mile races. Rahal finished 4th at Indy, second at the Michigan 500, and won the Pocono 500. His ten top five finishes kept him in contention for the title, but with only one win, he was struggling to keep pace with the Chevy-powered teams.

After winning the Michigan 500, Danny Sullivan took the points lead for the first time all year. The lead was short-lived, however, as he wrecked at Pocono. Rahal and Unser Jr. finished 1-2 at Pocono, and the top three in the standings were separated by only 5 points with five races remaining.

At Mid-Ohio, Rahal crashed out, and his title hopes began to fade. Sullivan and Unser were separated by 1 point with four races to go. All three drivers finished strong at Road America, and the championship battle pushed on. The turning point of the season came at Nazareth. Al Unser Jr. blew his engine, Rahal was not a factor, but Sullivan dominated. Sullivan started from the pole, and led the final 74 laps to score a crucial victory. With only two races left, Sullivan had a commanding 25-point lead. At the second-to-last race of the season at Laguna Seca, Sullivan pulled out a hat trick by winning the pole, leading the most laps, and winning the race. With still one race left, Sullivan clinched the 1988 CART title, holding an insurmountable 35-point lead. It was Sullivan's first and only championship title and Penske's first since 1985.

With the championship decided for Sullivan, the season finale at Miami became a race to see who would finish second in points. Rahal held an 8-point lead over Al Unser Jr., with Mario Andretti and Rick Mears also lurking in 4th and 5th, respectively. Unser Jr. dominated the race, leading 82 (of 112) laps and winning for the second time at the Tamiami Park circuit. Rahal blew an engine, Mario Andretti dropped out, and Mears finished second. The results saw a shake up in the standings, with Unser Jr. finishing second in points, Rahal third, and Mears slipping ahead of Andretti by 3 points for 4th and 5th.

Other stories from 1988 included A. J. Foyt returning to a full-time schedule (from 1980-1987, he only ran a partial schedule), and the Porsche Indy car team expanding to full-time with driver Teo Fabi. Rookie John Andretti suffered a devastating crash at the Pocono 500, but would recover before the end of the season. Jim Crawford, who suffered serious leg injuries in a crash in 1987, returned to the cockpit with a notable run at Indianapolis where he led 8 laps and finished 6th, the best result to-date for the Buick V-6 engine.

Drivers and constructors 

The following teams and drivers competed for the 1988 Indy Car World Series.

Season Summary

Schedule

 Oval/Speedway
 Dedicated road course
 Temporary street circuit
NC Non-championship event

Race results 

Indianapolis was USAC-sanctioned but counted towards the CART title.

Final driver standings

Nation's Cup 

 Top result per race counts towards Nation's Cup.

Chassis Constructor's Cup

Engine Manufacturer's Cup

References

See also
 1988 Indianapolis 500
 1988 American Racing Series season

Champ Car seasons
Indycar